Market Drayton railway station served the town of Market Drayton in Shropshire, England, between 1863 and 1963.

History

Four years later, on 16 October 1867, the Wellington and Drayton Railway (W&DR) opened, which connected the N&MDR at Market Drayton to the Great Western Railway (GWR) at Wellington.

On 1 February 1870, the North Staffordshire Railway (NSR) opened a line to Market Drayton from Silverdale. With the arrival of the NSR, the station had to be enlarged and was rebuilt in a French Renaissance style with ornamental iron features and square-topped pavilions at each end.

The opening of the NSR line was also accompanied by reciprocal running powers. The NSR also built its own small engine shed at Market Drayton which lasted until 1931.

The line from Silverdale closed on 7 May 1956, and the station closed when the line between Wellington and Nantwich closed on 9 September 1963. The line had been listed in Section 6 of the Beeching report as a line whose passenger services were under consideration for withdrawal before the formulation of the report, and Market Drayton station was listed in Section 7 as a passenger station already under consideration for closure before the formulation of the report. Freight services continued to use the route for a further four years until 1 May 1967.

The station site, which was situated to the east on the A529 Adderley Road, near the present site of Morrisons supermarket, is now covered by a factory complex. The idea of converting the trackbed of the Wellington to Nantwich line into a footpath was rejected by Cheshire County Council which considered it not "particularly attractive for walkers". In 1994 the site was sold for supermarket redevelopment, but the Nantwich and Market Drayton Railway Society was able to dismantle some of the buildings and artefacts.

Stationmasters

John Pearson Collett 1866 - 1875 (afterwards station master at Salisbury, then Weymouth)
Richard Henry Lea 1879 - 1913 (formerly station master at Hodnet)
Samuel Alfred Curtis 1914 - 1929
J.W. Thompson 1929 - 1936
Mr. Griffen from 1936  (formerly station master at Berrington)
A.C. Weaver from 1942 (formerly station master at Corwen)
Francis Burley ca. 1965

References

Further reading

External links
Market Drayton Station on navigable O.S. map

Disused railway stations in Shropshire
Former Great Western Railway stations
Railway stations in Great Britain opened in 1863
Railway stations in Great Britain closed in 1963
Market Drayton